Berlese or Berlèse is a surname. Notable people with the surname include:

 Antonio Berlese (1863–1927), Italian entomologist
 Augusto Napoleone Berlese (1864–1903), Italian botanist and mycologist, brother of Antonio
 Lorenzo Berlèse (1784–1863), Italian botanist

Italian-language surnames